Bede is a community in the Municipality of Two Borders, Manitoba, Canada. The community is located at the intersection of Highway 345 & Highway 83 between the communities of Broomhill and Bernice, approximately 115 km south-west of Brandon, Manitoba only 16 km north of the Town of Melita. Very little remains of Bede, only a historic school house and the community cemetery remain.

The first Post Office, located on 30-5-26W, was opened under the name of Shilson in 1897. It became Ruth in 1908 and was located on 18-5-26W. The P.O. became Bede in 1925. It became a Canadian Pacific railway point in 1906.

Infrastructure

Bede is served by Manitoba highways 345 and 83.

See also

 List of communities in Manitoba

References

 Geographic Names of Manitoba (pg. 22) - the Millennium Bureau of Canada

Localities in Manitoba
Unincorporated communities in Westman Region